Banu Makki was a Muslim dynasty that ruled over Gabés from 1282 until 1394. At their height, their domain extended from Gabés to Tripoli and Jabal Nafusa.
According to Angelino Dulcerta (1325 and 1339), the Catalan Atlas (1375) and the portlan chart of Guillem Soler (1380), the Banu makki had a yellow flag with a white crescent.

See also
Hafsid Dynasty
Catalan Atlas

References 

Government of Tunisia
1282 establishments
13th-century establishments in Africa
14th-century disestablishments in Africa
1394 disestablishments
History of Tunisia